John Walter Lloyd  (11 March 1879 -  9 July 1951) was a Welsh clergyman, most notably Archdeacon of Montgomery from 1944 until his death on 9 July 1951, aged 72.

Lloyd was educated at Llandovery College and St David's College, Lampeter and ordained 1903. After a curacy in Denbigh he held incumbencies at Glyntraian, Broughton, Chirk  and Llansantffraid.

References

1951 deaths
Alumni of the University of Wales, Lampeter
People educated at Llandovery College
20th-century Welsh Anglican priests
Archdeacons of Montgomery
1879 births